M Street or "M" Street is the thirteenth of a sequence of alphabetical streets in many cities (or the twelfth if "I" or "J" is omitted).

It may refer to:
M Street (Washington, D.C.) (3 such streets)
Greenland Hills, Dallas, also known as M Streets
M. Street, South Korean music group

See also
M Street Bridge (disambiguation), regarding M Streets in Sacramento, California, and in Washington, D.C.
M Street High School, Washington, D.C.